FIAS can refer to:

Fédération Indochinoise des Associations du Scoutisme
Federazione Italiana Attività Subacquee
Fellow of the Islamic World Academy of Sciences (IAS)
Frankfurt Institute for Advanced Studies
Fédération Internationale Amateur de Sambo
Frederick Irwin Anglican School
Foreign Investment Advisory Service, a multi-donor service of the International Finance Corporation (IFC), a member of the World Bank Group.
Farnborough International Air Show